Zububa is the northernmost Palestinian village in the West Bank, located 10 km Northwest of the city of Jenin in the northern West Bank.

History
This place is marked under the name Sububa on the map of Marino Sanuto (1322 A.D.), and identified by him with   Megiddo.

Ottoman era
In 1838 it was noted as a  Muslim  village called Ezbuba in the  Jenin administrative region.

In 1870, Victor Guérin noted it in the distance, as a small village on an oblong mound.

In 1882, the  PEF's  Survey of Western Palestine  described Ezbuba: "A village of mud, of moderate size, with wells  and cisterns. It stands near the foot of the hills, and is probably an ancient site, having a sarcophagus, and a wine-press to the south."

British Mandate era
In the 1922 census of Palestine conducted by the British Mandate authorities, Zebuba had a population 391 Muslims, decreasing  in the 1931 census to 344 Muslim, in  a total of 83 houses.

In  the 1945 statistics,   the population was 560  Muslims, with 13,843 dunams of land, according to an official land and population survey.  Of this, 209  dunams were used for plantations and irrigable land, 13,054  dunams were for cereals, while a total of  16 dunams were built-up, urban land.

Jordanian era
Following the 1948 Arab–Israeli War, and the subsequent 1949 Armistice Agreements, Zububa came under Jordanian rule.

The Jordanian census of 1961 found 683 inhabitants.

Israeli era
Since the 1967 Six-Day War, Zububa has been under Israeli rull   In early 1980s, the town became governed by the Israeli Civil Administration system.

With the Oslo Accords, the town came under the direct control of the Palestinian National Authority in 1994.

References

Bibliography

External links
  Welcome To Zububa
Survey of Western Palestine, Map 8: IAA, Wikimedia commons 

Villages in the West Bank
Jenin Governorate
Municipalities of the State of Palestine